Milind Kumar (born 15 February 1991) is an Indian professional cricketer who played for Delhi and Sikkim in domestic cricket. He is a right-hand batsman and an occasional off-break bowler. He was bought by Delhi Daredevils in the IPL Season 7 Auction for INR 10 Lakh. He was bought by Royal Challengers Bangalore in IPL12(2019) at his base price 20 lakhs.

Ahead of the 2018–19 Ranji Trophy, he was drafted from Delhi to Sikkim. he was the top scorer in 2018-19 Ranji Trophy with 1331 runs. In December 2018, he was bought by the Royal Challengers Bangalore in the player auction for the 2019 Indian Premier League.

In August 2019, he was named in the India Green team's squad for the 2019–20 Duleep Trophy. Later the same month, he left Sikkim cricket team ahead of the 2019–20 Ranji Trophy tournament. He was released by the Royal Challengers Bangalore ahead of the 2020 IPL auction.

In June 2021, he was selected to take part in the Minor League Cricket tournament in the United States following the players' draft.

References

External links 
Milind Kumar - Cricinfo profile
Milind Kumar - CricketArchive profile

Indian cricketers
Delhi cricketers
Living people
1991 births
Brothers Union cricketers
Sikkim cricketers